Bartville is an unincorporated community in Lancaster County, Pennsylvania, United States. It operated a post office during the 1870s and 1880s.

Sources

 Platt, Franklin and Platt, William. (1877). Report of Progress in the Cambria and Somerset district of the bituminous coalfields of western Pennsylvania. Part 2. Somerset County. Harrisburg, PA 
 Pennsylvania Geological Survey, 2nd series, HHH, xxiv, 348 p. illus. atlas, scale 1 in=2 mi. 
 Gap Survey 1876: Mineral resources, railroads, locales, people, schools and churches.

Unincorporated communities in Lancaster County, Pennsylvania
Unincorporated communities in Pennsylvania